Thomas Ray may refer to:
 Thomas S. Ray (born 1954), American ecologist
 Thomas Ray (cricketer) (1770–?), English cricketer
 Tom Ray (1919–2010), American animator
 Tom V. Ray (born 1965), American bassist
 Thomas K. Ray, Episcopal bishop in the USA, Bishop of Northern Michigan
 Thomas Matthew Ray (1801–1881), Irish nationalist, politician, activist and author

See also
 Ray Thomas (disambiguation)
 Tom Re (1913–1996), Australian rules footballer